Vilshanka is an urban-type settlement in Holovanivsk Raion of Kirovohrad Oblast in Ukraine. It is located on the left bank of the Syniukha, a left tributary of the Southern Bug. Vilshanka hosts the administration of Vilshanka settlement hromada, one of the hromadas of Ukraine.  Population: 

Until 18 July 2020, Vilshanka was the administrative center of Vilshanka Raion. The raion was abolished in July 2020 as part of the administrative reform of Ukraine, which reduced the number of raions of Kirovohrad Oblast to four. The area of Vilshanka Raion was merged into Holovanivsk Raion.

Economy

Transportation
The settlement has road access to  Pervomaisk and from there to Highway H24 connecting Holovanivsk and Mykolaiv.

The closest railway station is in Pervomaisk on the railway connecting Kropyvnytskyi with Vinnytsia and Odessa.

References

Urban-type settlements in Holovanivsk Raion